Random Sound West, previously known as  Hillview-Adeytown-Hatchet Cove-St. Jones Within, is a local service district and designated place in the Canadian province of Newfoundland and Labrador.

Geography 
Hillview-Adeytown-Hatchet Cove-St. Jones Within (Random Sound West) is in Newfoundland within Subdivision M of Division No. 7.

Demographics 

Government 
Random Sound West is a local service district (LSD) that is governed by a committee responsible for the provision of certain services to the community. The chair of the LSD committee is Robert Gammon.

See also 
List of communities in Newfoundland and Labrador
List of designated places in Newfoundland and Labrador
List of local service districts in Newfoundland and Labrador

References 

Local service districts in Newfoundland and Labrador